Corrina is a given name. Notable people with the name include:

Corrina Gould, Californian Native American activist
Corrina Hewat (born 1970), Scottish harpist and composer
Corrina Joseph, British singer who collaborated with Basement Jaxx
Corrina Kennedy (born 1970), Canadian sprint kayaker
Corrina Repp, vocalist, guitarist, songwriter, and maker of quiet music
Corrina Sephora Mensoff (born 1971), American visual artist
Corrina Wycoff, American writer

See also
Corinna, an Ancient Greek poet
Corrina, Corrina (film), a 1994 feature film
"Corrine, Corrina", a country blues song
Corina (disambiguation)
Corinna (disambiguation)
Corrine (disambiguation)